Gilberto "Gil" Meireles Ferreira (born 6 December 1981) is a Brazilian footballer currently playing for Cheng Fung of Macau.

1981 births
Living people
Footballers from São Paulo
Brazilian footballers
Brazilian expatriate footballers
Deportes Melipilla footballers
Primera B de Chile players
C.D. Monte Carlo players
Expatriate footballers in Chile
Expatriate footballers in Macau
Expatriate footballers in Croatia
Expatriate footballers in Portugal
Brazilian expatriate sportspeople in Chile
Brazilian expatriate sportspeople in Macau
Brazilian expatriate sportspeople in Croatia
Brazilian expatriate sportspeople in Portugal
Association football defenders